The Single Resolution Board (SRB) is an EU agency that was established in Brussels in 2015 as part of the broader set of reforms known as the banking union. It acts as the resolution authority for a subset of banks in the euro area and as the institutional hub of the Single Resolution Mechanism. Resolution is the restructuring of a bank by a resolution authority through the use of resolution tools in order to safeguard public interests, including the continuity of the bank's critical functions and financial stability, at minimal costs to taxpayers.

History

The SRB was established by the EU Single Resolution Mechanism Regulation of 2014 and became operational on 1 January 2015, with full assumption of its resolution authority on 1 January 2016. 

Its early development was supported by the European Commission. It moved to its current office on Treurenberg 22 in central Brussels in late 2015. 

The initial activity of the SRB was largely about establishing processes and methodologies, particularly in the area of resolution planning. In June 2017, the SRB took its first decision to take resolution action in the case of Banco Popular Español. In March 2022, the European unit of Sberbank went into resolution, in the context of the 2022 Russian invasion of Ukraine and the ensuing EU sanctions against Russian lenders : the SRB decided that Sberbank's Austrian subsidiary was going into insolvency, while it sold its Croatian unit to Hrvatska postanska banka and Sberbank's Slovenian subsidiary to Nova Ljubljanska Banka.

Single Resolution Fund

The Single Resolution Fund (SRF) was established by the SRM Regulation. Where necessary, it may be used to ensure the efficient application of resolution tools and the exercise of the resolution powers conferred to the SRB by the SRM Regulation. The SRF is composed of contributions from credit institutions and certain investment firms in the 19 participating Member States within the Banking Union. It is being gradually built up during the period until 2023 included, and shall reach the target level of at least 1% of the amount of covered deposits of all credit institutions within the Banking Union by 31 December 2023. By July 2022, the SRF had reached a size of €66 billion.

Board members

The Board is composed of six members : the SRB Chair, the Vice-Chair and four full-time Board Members. These four full-time Board Members as well as the Vice-Chair are responsible for SRB directorates. The composition of the Board has been, over time, the following one:
Chair: 
 Elke König, (2015-2022)
 Dominique Laboureix (since 2023)
Vice Chair: 
 Timo Löyttyniemi, Vice Chair (2015-2020)
 Jan Reinder De Carpentier, Vice Chair (since 2020)
Full-time Board Members: 
  (2015-2017)
 Mauro Grande (2015-2019)
 Dominique Laboureix (2015-2019)
 Antonio Carrascosa (2015-2020)
  (2018-2023)
 Sebastiano Laviola (since 2019)
 Pedro Machado (since 2020)
 Jesús Saurina (since 2020)
 Tuija Taos (since 2023)

External links 
 Regulation (EU) No 806/2014 of 15 July 2014
 Single Resolution Board 
 Official website

See also

 Banking union
 Single Supervisory Mechanism

Notes

Agencies of the European Union
Eurozone